Yulia Valerianovna Zhadovskaya was a Russian poet and writer of fiction.

Biography
Zhadovskaya was born disabled; she had no left arm and was missing several fingers on her right hand. Her mother, who had graduated from the prestigious Smolny Institute, and who died when Yulia was only 3, was very protective of Yulia because of her disability. At her death Yulia's mother asked Yulia's grandmother to take special care of her. Yulia also lived with and studied French with her aunt, the poet Anna Gotovtsova, who had written an epigram challenging Alexander Pushkin's depiction of women.

At the age of 19 Yulia adopted Gotovtsova's daughter Fyodorova, who became her amanuensis and close friend until Yulia's death. Fyodorova, in her memoir of Yulia, presents her as a strong and determined woman who overcame her disabilities to become a successful poet and writer. Several of Yulia's poems were made into popular songs. She married a family friend at the age of 38. From the time of her marriage until her death at 59 she wrote no more poetry. Fyodorova suggested that the marriage may not have been a happy one.

Legacy
Zhadovskaya's best work is her love and nature lyric poetry. Nikolay Nekrasov's poetry influenced her work of the late 1840s and the 1850s. Zhadovskaya's lyric poetry is part of the folksong tradition. Among her poems made into popular songs was Cornfield, My Cornfield, My Golden Cornfield, set to music by Mikhail Glinka and Alexander Dargomyzhsky. Her novel Aloof From the Social Whirl (1857) and her stories are devoted to the problems of love, marriage, and the emancipation of women. A raznochintsy intellectual is the subject of her story The Backward Girl (1861).

Poem

The Contrast 

Dear, you will soon forget me,You I shall ne'er forget,You'll find new loves for old ones,For me love's sun is set.New faces soon will greet you,You'll choose yourself new friends,New thoughts you'll get and haplyNew joy to make amends:While I in silent sorrowLife's joyless way shall go,And how I love and sufferOnly the grave will know.

Further reading

References

1824 births
1883 deaths
People from Rybinsky District, Yaroslavl Oblast
People from Lyubimsky Uyezd
Russian women short story writers
Russian women novelists
Russian women poets
19th-century novelists from the Russian Empire
19th-century women writers from the Russian Empire
19th-century writers from the Russian Empire
19th-century short story writers from the Russian Empire